Pleasant View Township is located in Macon County, Illinois. As of the 2010 census, its population was 1,481 and it contained 620 housing units.

Cities and towns 
 Blue Mound

Adjacent townships 
 Blue Mound Township (north)
 South Macon Township (northeast and east)
 Moweaqua Township, Shelby County (southeast)
 Prairieton Township, Christian County (south)
 Stonington Township, Christian County (southwest and west)
 Mosquito Township, Christian County (west and northwest)

Geography

Demographics

References

External links
US Census
City-data.com
Illinois State Archives

Townships in Macon County, Illinois
Townships in Illinois